Methul is a locality in the central north part of the Riverina region of south west New South Wales, Australia.

Towns in the Riverina
Towns in New South Wales
Coolamon Shire